Chriacus is an extinct genus of placental mammals that lived in what is now North America during the Paleocene epoch and died out after the early Eocene. In life, members of the genus would have looked something like a kinkajou or binturong, though they were not closely related to any living mammal. Well preserved fossils allow clear information on what they looked like. Other features include a light build, weighing approximately 7 kg (15 lb), and many adaptations typical of animals that live in trees. These include walking on the soles of their five-toed feet, and having long, curved, compressed claws. The powerfully built limbs had flexible joints, especially the ankles, an adaptation that allows an animal to turn its hind feet behind it, like modern tree squirrels, in order to climb downward. They were probably omnivores, eating fruit, eggs, insects and small mammals.

Analysis of casts of the brain and inner ear from Chriacus pelvidens and C. baldwini suggest these animals depended more on their sense of smell than sight, may have been able to hear about as well as a modern aardvark, and were slow-moving to moderately agile. The encephalization quotient (EQ) had a range of 0.12–0.41 (1.0=average brain size compared with modern mammals of a similar body size) and the neocortex was less developed than later mammals. By the standards of modern mammals, they would have been neither especially quick nor intelligent, but their brains were comparable to many mammals of their time. Derived features of the inner ear were shared with fossils that are assigned to Euungulata (artiodactyls+perissodactyls), suggesting the genus may be close to the origin of ungulates, though it is too different in form to be a direct ancestor.

Classification 
There are nine species currently recognized in the genus. Like most early placental mammals, the classification of Chriacus in relation to other groups is disputed. Halliday et al. (2015) consider it a member of the family Oxyclaenidae, a sister group to Palaeoryctids and Creodonts, while Tabuce et al. (2011) classify it as an arctocyonid, most closely related to Loxolophus, then Arctocyon, and allied to the mesonychids. This difference mirrors the history of the mammals classified as arctocyonids. They were first considered creodonts (imagined to be the ancestors of modern carnivores), and then "condylarths," (imagined to be the ancestors of hoofed mammals). Modern studies suggest the confusion is due to the fact that ungulates, carnivores, and creodonts are related groups, and flesh-eating lineages and adaptations evolved within each of them. Chriacus lies somewhere within the range of their early relatives.

References

 Article on Paleocene mammals
 Technical information in the Paleobiology database

External links
Picture of a Chriacus reconstructed from skeletons

Condylarths
Paleocene mammals of North America
Eocene mammals of North America
Fossil taxa described in 1883
Prehistoric placental genera